The James William Clyde House, at 312 S. Main St. in Heber City, Utah, was listed on the National Register of Historic Places in 1996.

It is a one-story red brick house built around 1884.  It was expanded with rear wooden additions around the 1920s.  It has a modified cross-wing plan and has Victorian eclectic details.

References

National Register of Historic Places in Wasatch County, Utah
Victorian architecture in Utah
Houses completed in 1889